Bartolomeo di Tommaso, also known as Bartolomeo da Foligno (born in Foligno, c. 1400, active by 1425, died 1453–54) was an Italian painter of the Umbro-Sienese school.

Life and career
He was in Ancona from 1425 to 1442, when he returned to Foligno with his wife, Onofria, the sister of the painter Pierantonio Mezzastris.  Bartolomeo was documented in Norcia in 1442, at work in the choir of Sant’ Agostino with a group of painters, including Nicola di Ulisse from Siena; Luca di Lorenzo from Germany; Giambono di Corrado of Ragusa; and Andrea de Litio. The administration of Pope Nicholas V asked him to come to Rome and work in various projects.

He painted a Virgin and Saints in 1430 for the church of San Salvatore at Foligno.

References

Attribution

External links
Italian Paintings: Sienese and Central Italian Schools, a collection catalog containing information about Tommaso and his works (see index; plates 36–37).
Intorno a Bartolomeo di Tommaso, Ricerche sulla “Scuola di Ancona”, article by Matteo Mazzalupi.

Year of birth unknown
1450s deaths
Quattrocento painters
Italian male painters
15th-century Italian painters
Umbrian painters
People from Foligno